Senna domingensis is a flowering plant species in the legume family (Fabaceae). It is a threatened species, found in Cuba, the Dominican Republic, and Haiti.

Etymology
The species has been given the specific epithet "domingensis", as it occurs on the island of Hispaniola. This island was historically called Santo Domingo, or Saint-Domingue.

References

domingensis
Flora of Cuba
Flora of the Dominican Republic
Flora of Haiti
Vulnerable plants
Taxonomy articles created by Polbot